East Whittier is an unincorporated community in Los Angeles County, California, United States. The population was 9,757 at the 2010 census, up from 9,538 at the 2000 census. For statistical purposes, the United States Census Bureau has defined this community as a census-designated place (CDP). The name was changed from East La Mirada in 2012, likely due to its precise location in relation to the city of Whittier. The previous delineation of East Whittier CDP occurred during the 1960 census, when the area recorded a population of 19,884.

Geography
East Whittier is located at  (33.924403, -117.988975).

Demographics

2010
The 2010 United States Census reported that the CDP had a population of 9,757. The racial makeup of the CDP was 7,022 (72.0%) White (41.5% Non-Hispanic White), 178 (1.8%) African American, 78 (0.8%) Native American, 462 (4.7%) Asian, 20 (0.2%) Pacific Islander, 1,557 (16.0%) from other races, and 440 (4.5%) from two or more races. Hispanic or Latino of any race were 4,907 persons (50.3%).

The Census reported that 9,742 people (99.8% of the population) lived in households, 15 (0.2%) lived in non-institutionalized group quarters, and 0 (0%) were institutionalized.

There were 3,295 households, out of which 1,298 (39.4%) had children under the age of 18 living in them, 1,826 (55.4%) were opposite-sex married couples living together, 479 (14.5%) had a female householder with no husband present, 201 (6.1%) had a male householder with no wife present.  There were 195 (5.9%) unmarried opposite-sex partnerships, and 21 (0.6%) same-sex married couples or partnerships. 619 households (18.8%) were made up of individuals, and 303 (9.2%) had someone living alone who was 65 years of age or older. The average household size was 2.96.  There were 2,506 families (76.1% of all households); the average family size was 3.36.

The population was spread out, with 2,356 people (24.1%) under the age of 18, 1,117 people (11.4%) aged 18 to 24, 2,636 people (27.0%) aged 25 to 44, 2,389 people (24.5%) aged 45 to 64, and 1,259 people (12.9%) who were 65 years of age or older.  The median age was 36.2 years. For every 100 females, there were 94.2 males.  For every 100 females age 18 and over, there were 91.9 males.

The homeowner vacancy rate was 0.6%; the rental vacancy rate was 4.6%.  6,598 people (67.6% of the population) lived in owner-occupied housing units and 3,144 people (32.2%) lived in rental housing units.

According to the United States Census Bureau, East Whittier has a median household income of $68,110, with 5.1% of the population living below the federal poverty line.

2000
As of the census of 2000, there were 9,538 people, 3,321 households, and 2,480 families residing in the CDP. The population density was 8,559.0 inhabitants per square mile (3,317.7/km). The racial makeup of the CDP was 75.29% White, 1.79% Black or African American, 0.77% Native American, 3.65% Asian, 0.14% Pacific Islander, 13.48% from other races, and 4.89% from two or more races.  38.16% of the population were Hispanic or Latino of any race.

There were 3,321 households, out of which 36.7% had children under the age of 18 living with them, 58.1% were married couples living together, 12.0% had a female householder with no husband present, and 25.3% were non-families. 19.8% of all households were made up of individuals, and 8.6% had someone living alone who was 65 years of age or older.  The average household size was 2.86 and the average family size was 3.32.

In the CDP, the population was spread out, with 27.5% under the age of 18, 9.2% from 18 to 24, 30.0% from 25 to 44, 20.8% from 45 to 64, and 12.5% who were 65 years of age or older.  The median age was 35 years. For every 100 females, there were 94.6 males.  For every 100 females age 18 and over, there were 91.3 males.

The median income for a household in the CDP was $51,440, and the median income for a family was $59,063. Males had a median income of $46,395 versus $31,670 for females. The per capita income for the CDP was $20,613.  About 4.3% of families and 5.8% of the population were below the poverty line, including 2.7% of those under age 18 and 10.3% of those age 65 or over.

Government

The community is represented at the local government level by Los Angeles County Supervisor Janice Hahn.

Police services are provided by the Los Angeles County Sheriff's Department station located in Norwalk.

Fire services are provided by Los Angeles County Fire Department via Fire Station 15, located at 11460 Santa Gertrudes Avenue. Station 15 is staffed with four personnel that are deployed on a Quint fire apparatus.

Paramedic services are provided from nearby stations in La Mirada (Squad 49), and La Habra (Squad 191).

Climate
According to the Köppen Climate Classification system, East Whittier has a warm-summer Mediterranean climate, abbreviated "Csa" on climate maps.

References

Census-designated places in Los Angeles County, California
Census-designated places in California